Pigeon Hill is an unincorporated community in Clarke County, Virginia. Pigeon Hill lies on the Lord Fairfax Highway (U.S. Route 340) south of Berryville.

Unincorporated communities in Clarke County, Virginia
Unincorporated communities in Virginia